Woman's Club of Ocoee is a national historic site located at 10 North Lakewood Avenue, Ocoee, Florida in Orange County.

It was added to the National Register of Historic Places in 2011.

References

External links

 

National Register of Historic Places in Orange County, Florida
Ocoee, Florida
Buildings and structures completed in 1938
1938 establishments in Florida